The UNOH 100 was a NASCAR K&N Pro Series East race held annually at Richmond International Raceway from 2011 to 2015.

History
NASCAR decided to add a NASCAR K&N Pro Series East race at Richmond International Raceway for the 2011 season. The final race in 2015 was shortened due to rain.

Past winners

2012: Race extended due to overtime.
2015: Race shortened due to rain.

References

External links
 Richmond International Raceway on NASCAR.com
 

ARCA Menards Series East
Former NASCAR races
NASCAR races at Richmond Raceway